is an airport in Japan,  located  west northwest of Kushiro, Hokkaidō.

Airlines and destinations

International charter flights to Kushiro began in 2000 and have operated from South Korea, Taiwan and Hong Kong.

History 
The airport opened in July 1961 with a 1,200 meter runway. It has been expanded and upgraded several times; a taxiway parallel to the runway opened in 1988, a Category 3a instrument landing system (ILS) became operational in 1995, and a new passenger terminal, 2.6 times the size of the original terminal, opened in 1998.

Terminal 
Kushiro Airport has a single passenger terminal on three levels with three boarding gates. It is designed primarily for domestic flights, but has limited customs and immigration facilities for international charter arrivals.

Ground transport 
A bus service runs between the airport and the town of Kushiro, taking about 25 minutes and calling at the railway station, "MOO" shopping complex and a few other locations. The bus is approximately timed with flight arrivals / departures. There is no rail link connecting the airport.

References

External links
Kushiro Airport Website (in Japanese)

Airports in Hokkaido